Events from the year 1901 in France.

Incumbents
President: Émile Loubet
President of the Council of Ministers: Pierre Waldeck-Rousseau

Events
10 August – Moberly-Jourdain incident.

Arts and literature
17 March – A showing of 71 Vincent van Gogh paintings in Paris, 11 years after his death, creates a sensation.

Sport
1 January – The French rugby team plays its first Test against the New Zealand All Blacks.

Births

January to March
1 January – Marcel Balsa, motor racing driver (died 1984)
2 January – Louis Poterat, lyricist (died 1982)
8 January – Eugène Constant, rower and Olympic medallist (died 1971)
19 January – Henri Daniel-Rops, writer and historian (died 1965)
24 January – Adolphe Mouron Cassandre, painter, commercial poster artist and typeface designer (died 1968)
20 February
Marc Detton, rower and Olympic medallist (died 1977)
René Dubos, microbiologist, experimental pathologist, environmentalist and humanist (died 1982)
21 February
Albert Dupouy, rugby union player (died 1973)
Pierre Lewden, athlete (died 1989)
3 March – Corentin Louis Kervran, scientist (died 1983)
17 March – Alexandre Bioussa, rugby union player (died 1966)
26 March – Maurice Dorléac, actor (died 1979)

April to June
7 April – 
André Trocmé, pastor who aided Jewish refugees (died 1971)
Annemarie von Gabain, German linguist (died 1993) 
8 April – Jean Prouvé, architect and designer (died 1984)
13 April – Jacques Lacan, psychoanalyst, psychiatrist, and doctor (died 1981)
15 April – René Pleven, politician (died 1993)
20 April – Michel Leiris, surrealist writer and ethnographer (died 1990)
24 April – René Le Hénaff, film editor and director (died 2005)
15 May – Jacques Natanson, writer (died 1975)
18 May- Henri Sauguet, composer (died 1989)
25 May
Jean Borthayre, operatic baritone (died 1984)
André Girard, painter, poster-maker and Resistance member (died 1968)
31 May – Charles Brunier, convicted murderer and veteran of the First and Second World Wars who claimed to have been the inspiration for Papillon (died 2007)
16 June – Henri Lefebvre, sociologist and philosopher (died 1991)
24 June – Marcel Mule, classical saxophonist (died 2001)
26 June – Jean Boyer, film director and author (died 1965)

July to September
20 July – Gaston Waringhien, linguist, lexicographer and Esperantist (died 1991)
31 July – Jean Dubuffet, painter and sculptor (died 1985)
5 August – Claude Autant-Lara, film director and later MEP (died 2000)
17 August – Henri Tomasi, composer and conductor (died 1971)
18 August – Jean Guitton, Catholic philosopher and theologian (died 1999)
19 August – René Capitant, lawyer and politician (died 1970)
27 August – Pierre Villon, member of the French Communist Party and of the French Resistance (died 1980)
29 August – Michel Olçomendy, first Archbishop of the Singapore (died 1977)
8 September – Jacques Perret, writer (died 1992)
16 September
Andrée Brunet, figure skater (died 1993)
Louis Joxe, statesman and Minister (died 1991)
25 September – Robert Bresson, film director (died 1999)

October to December
3 October – François Le Lionnais, chemical engineer and mathematician (died 1984)
12 October – Gabriel-Marie Garrone, Cardinal (died 1994)
3 November – André Malraux, author, adventurer and statesman (died 1976)
14 December – Henri Cochet, tennis player (died 1987)

Full date unknown
Roland Ansieau, graphic artist (died 1987)

Deaths
5 January – Pierre Potain, cardiologist (born 1825)
13 January – Gaspard Adolphe Chatin, physician, mycologist and botanist (born 1813)
16 January – Jules Barbier, poet and librettist (born 1825)
28 January – Henri de Bornier, poet and dramatist (born 1825)
9 February – Louis-Nicolas Ménard, man of letters (born 1822)
17 March – Jean-Charles Cazin, landscape painter and ceramicist (born 1840)
29 March – Xavier Barbier de Montault, theologian (born 1830)
9 June – Casimir Marie Gaudibert, astronomer and selenographer (born 1823)
28 July – Paul Alexis, novelist, dramatist and journalist (born 1847)
12 August – Ernest de Jonquières, mathematician (born 1820)
17 August – Edmond Audran, composer (born 1840)
9 September – Henri de Toulouse-Lautrec, painter (born 1864)
date unknown 
Henriette Browne, painter and traveller (born 1829)
Charles Jalabert, painter (born 1819)

See also
 List of French films before 1910

References

1900s in France